Veleia was the name of two Roman towns:

Veleia (Italy)
Iruña-Veleia, Basque Country, Spain